The Eastfield Mall is a shopping mall in Springfield, Massachusetts, which is owned by Mountain Development Corporation, and was built in late 1967 by the Rouse Company. The three anchors, JCPenney, Macy's, and Sears closed in 2011, 2016, and 2018, respectively. The movie theater, Cinemark closed in 2020. The mall is managed by Mountain Development.

History
Eastfield Mall opened in 1967 with three anchors, two of which were local department stores: Forbes & Wallace and Steiger's. The third anchor store, Sears, also opened with the mall. Forbes & Wallace closed in 1975 leaving the space vacant, it was eventually sold to JCPenney, which moved into the former space. In 1994, Filene's, whose parent company May Department Stores had bought Steiger's moved into their old space. This store became Macy's in 2006 after May was purchased by Federated Department Stores (Macy's parent company at the time). The 16 screen movie theater was added in 2000 and was initially a Showcase Cinemas. The theater later became owned by Cinemark.

The addition of a Steve & Barry's clothing store in 2006 put the mall at full occupancy for the first time since 1978. The store displaced nine smaller retail outlets, of which only two relocated within the mall. This store closed in 2008 following the chain's bankruptcy proceedings. In 2009, Hannoush Jewelers opened a showroom in the space vacated by Steve & Barry's. In 2004, the mall implemented a teen escort policy, stating that any customer under the age of 15 must be with an escort after 5:00 PM. The JCPenney store was later downgraded to an outlet store, and closed in 2011 when JCPenney eliminated its outlet store division.

On January 6, 2016, Macy's announced that it would be closing the Eastfield Mall location as part of a plan to close 36 stores nationwide. The store closed in April 2016.

On May 31, 2018, Sears announced that its store would also be closing on September 2, 2018 as part of a plan to close 78 stores nationwide which left the mall with no store anchors.

In late June 2020, Cinemark closed permanently.

References

External links
Official website
Parent Company

Shopping malls in Massachusetts
Economy of Springfield, Massachusetts
Buildings and structures in Springfield, Massachusetts
Tourist attractions in Springfield, Massachusetts
Shopping malls established in 1967